Chrysophyllum africanum is a medium sized tree within the Sapotaceae family. It is sometimes known as the African Star Apple along with the closely related Chrysophyllum albidum. Both species have similar leaf indumentum and are widespread in the Lower and Upper Guinea forest mosaic.

Description 
Species reaches 25 meters in height, the trunk is straight, often grooved and angular with buttressed roots at the base. Bark is greyish brown to dark brown with white latex exuding from slash. Leaves simple and appear at the end of branches in tufts; petiole is 1.5-3.5 cm long, the abaxial surface has dense and appressed hairs and varies in color from pale brown to  reddish-brown,  adaxial surface is glabrous; leaf-blade is elliptical to oblong, 15-35 cm long and 5-13 cm wide, with 18-26 primary nerves on each side spaced 1-2 cm apart. Fruit is ovoid to globular shaped, with up to 5 shiny brown elliptical seeds; the fruit is rounded at the base, pointed or rounded at apex, 2.3-3 cm in diameter and up to 7 cm long, when ripe is it yellowish to orange colored.

Distribution 
Occurs in Tropical West Africa and eastwards towards Uganda and Southwards to the Democratic republic of Congo and Cabinda, it is commonly found in lowland rainforest vegetation, near rivers.

Uses 
Latex is obtained from the tree bark and used for birdlime while the wood is often mixed with other African Chrysophyllum species traded in the timber market. The fruit is edible though acidulous, while bark extracts are used in decoctions to improve digestion.

References

Flora of West Tropical Africa
africanum